A list of notable Latin American visual artists (painters, sculptors, photographers, video artists, etc.), arranged by nationality:

Argentina

 Roberto Aizenberg (1928–1996)
 Antonio Alice (1886–1943)
 Antonio Berni (1905–1981)
 Delia Cancela (born 1940)
 Graciela Carnevale (born 1942)
 Elda Cerrato (born 1930)
 Alicia Creus (born 1939)
 José Cuneo (born 1965)
 León Ferrari (1920-2013)
 Lucio Fontana (1899–1968)
 Alfredo Guttero (1882–1932)
 Esteban Lisa (1895–1983)
 Cándido López (1840–1902)
 Rebeca Mendoza (born 1967)
 Florencio Molina Campos (1891–1959)
 Marta Minujín (born 1944)
 Marcelo Pombo (born 1959)
 Liliana Porter (born 1941)
 Alfredo Prior (born 1952)
 Benito Quinquela Martín (1890–1977)
 Xul Solar (1887–1963)
 Raúl Soldi (1905–1994)
 Manuel Zorrilla (1919-2015)
  Grete Stern (1904-1999)
Roberto Jacoby (born 1944)
Bibi Zogbé (1890-1973)

Bolivia

 Rodolfo Ayoroa (1927–2003), painter, printmaker, sculptor
 Roberto Berdecio (1910–1996), muralist, painter, printmaker
 Gonzalo Condarco, sculptor
 Inés Córdova (1927–2010), painter, potter
 Alfredo Da Silva (1935-2020), painter and photographer
 Alejandra Dorado (born 1969), installation and performance artist
 Sonia Falcone (born 1965), painter
 Graciela Rodo Boulanger (born 1935), painter and printmaker
 Roberto Mamani Mamani, painter
 Master of Calamarca (early 18th century), painter 
 Benjamín Mendoza y Amor Flores (1933-2004), painter
 Marina Núñez del Prado (c. 1910–1995), sculptor
 María Luisa Pacheco (1919–1982), painter and illustrator
 Cecilio Guzmán de Rojas (1899–1950), painter
 Francisco Tito Yupanqui (1550–1616), sculptor
 Gastón Ugalde (born 1946)
 Rosmery Mamani Ventura (born 1985), painter
 Alejandro Mario Yllanes (1913–1960), painter and printmaker

Brazil

 Aleijadinho (1730–1814)
 Tarsila do Amaral (1886–1973)
 Artur Barrio (born 1945)
 Lenora de Barros (born 1953)
 Di Cavalcanti (1897–1976)
 Amílcar de Castro (1920–2002)
 Lygia Clark (1920–1988)
 Oswaldo Goeldi (1895–1961)
 Anna Maria Maiolino (born 1942)
 Anita Malfatti (1889–1964)
 Cildo Meireles (born 1948)
 Vik Muniz (born 1961)
 Hélio Oiticica (1937–1980)
 José Ferraz de Almeida Júnior (1850–1899)
 Naza (born 1955)
 Ismael Nery (1900–1934)
 Lygia Pape (1927–2004)
 Wanda Pimentel (1943-2015)
 Cândido Portinari (1903–1962)
 Lasar Segall (1891–1957)
 Teresinha Soares (born 1927)
 Amelia Toledo (1926-2017)
 Adriana Varejão (born 1964)
 Cybèle Varela (born 1943)
 Guy Veloso (born 1969)
 Alfredo Volpi (1896-1988)
 Márcia X (1959-2005)

Chicano

 Lalo Alcaraz (born 1964)
 Carlos Almaraz (1941–1989)
 Cecilia Alvarez (born 1950)
 Miguel Angel Reyes (born 1964)
 Alfonso Arana (1927–2005)
 Gus Arriola (1917–2008)
 John August Swanson (1938–2021)
 Judy Baca (born 1946)
 Enrique Chagoya (born 1953), printmaker, painter
 Jerry De La Cruz (born 1948)
 Roberto de la Rocha
 Richard Dominguez (born 1960)
 Edgar de Evia (1910–2003)
 Elsa Flores (born 1955)
 Harry Gamboa, Jr. (born 1951)
 David Gonzales (cartoonist) (born 1964)
 Robert Graham (sculptor) (1938–2008)
 Manuel Gregorio Acosta (1921–1989)
 Gronk (born 1957)
 Ester Hernandez (born 1944)
 Gilbert Hernandez (born 1957)
 Jaime Hernandez (born 1959)
 Javier Hernandez (born 1966)
 Mario Hernandez (born 1953)
 Yolanda Lopez (1942–2021)
 Gilbert Luján (1940-2011)
 Xavier Martínez (1859–1943)
 Alberto Mijangos (1925–2007)
 Laura Molina (born 1957)
 Rafael Navarro (born 1967)
 Manuel Neri (1930–2021)
 Rafael Vargas-Suarez (born 1972)
 Mark Vallen (born 1953)
 Emigdio Vasquez (1939–2014)
 Jhonen Vasquez (born 1974)
 Esteban Villa (born 1930)

Chile

Joan Belmar
Carlos Catasse (1944–2010)
 Santos Chávez (1934–2001), printmaker
 Marta Colvin (1907–1995)
 Eugenio Cruz Vargas (1923–2014)
 Juan Davila
 Guillermo Deisler (1940–1995)
 Marcela Donoso (born 1961)
 Freddy Flores Knistoff (born 1948)
 Alfredo Jaar (born 1956)
 LasTesis
 Pedro Lira (1845–1912)
 Roberto Matta (1911–2002)
 Gordon Matta-Clark (1943–1978), Chilean-American
 Camilo Mori (1896–1973)
 José Manuel Ramírez Rosales (1804–1877)
 Thomas Somerscales (1842–1927)
 Catalina Parra (born 1940), political/feminist conceptual artist

Colombia

 Julio Abril (1912–1979)
 Liliana Angulo Cortés (born 1974)
 Débora Arango (1907–2005)
 Fernando Botero (born 1932)
 Antonio Caro (1950–2021)
 Juan Fernando Cobo (born 1959)
 Danilo Dueñas (born 1956)
 Miguel de la Espriella "Noble" (born 1947)
 Carlos Jacanamijoy (born 1964), painter
 Ignacio Gómez Jaramillo
 Enrique Grau (1920–2004)
 Santiago Martínez Delgado (1906–1954)
 Édgar Negret
 Alejandro Obregón (1920–1992)
 Omar Rayo (1928–2010)
 Bernardo Ríos (born 1959)
 Pedro Restrepo
 Doris Salcedo (born 1958)

Cuba

Jose Acosta Hernandez (born 1966)
José Braulio Bedia Valdés (born 1959)
José Bernal (1925–2010)
F. Lennox Campello (born 1956)
María Magdalena Campos Pons (born 1959)
Yoan Capote
Manuel Carbonell (1917–2011)
Pedro Álvarez Castelló (1967–2004)
Humberto Jesús Castro García (born 1957)
Rafael Consuegra (1941-2021)
Felipe Dulzaides
Carlos Enríquez (1900–1957)
Roberto Fabelo (born 1951)
Agustín Fernández (1928–2006)
Teresita Fernández 
Miguel Fleitas (born 1956)
Coco Fusco (born 1960)
Lourdes Gomez Franca (1933-2018)
Félix González-Torres (1957–1996)
Nestor Hernandez (1961–2006)
Carmen Herrera (born 1915)
Miguel Jorge (1928-1984)
Alberto Korda, photographer
Kcho (born 1970)
Wifredo Lam (1902–1982)
Los Carpinteros
Ana Mendieta (1948–1985)
Rene Mederos (1933–1996)
Adriano Nicot (born 1964)
Amelia Peláez (1896–1968)
Marta María Pérez Bravo (born 1969)
Dionisio Perkins (1929-2015)
Carlos Enrique Prado Herrera (born 1978)
Wilfredo Prieto
Sandra Ramos (born 1969)
Miguel Rodez (born 1956)
Emilio Hector Rodriguez (born 1950)
Baruj Salinas (born 1935)
Juan T. Vázquez Martín (1941-2017)

Dominican Republic

Cándido Bidó (1936–2011)
Jaime Colson (1901–1975)
Celeste Woss y Gil (1891-1985)
Yoryi Morel (1906-1979)
Paul Giudicelli
Delia Weber (1900-1982)
Tito Canepa (1916-2014)
Olivia Peguero
Ada Balcácer (born 1930)
Rigo Peralta
Guillo Pérez (1923-2014)
Amaya Salazar (born 1951)
Darío Suro (1917-1997)
Rosa Tavarez (born 1939)
Eligio Pichardo (1929-1984)
Clara Ledesma (1924-1999)
Gilberto Hernández Ortega (1923-1979)
Raquel Paiewonsky (born 1969)
Edward Telleria (born 1974)
Alberto Ulloa (1950-2011)
Oscar Abreu (born 1978)

Ecuador

 Aníbal Villacís (1927–2012)
 Araceli Gilbert (1913–1993)
 Caesar Andrade Faini (1913–1995)
 Camilo Egas (1889–1962)
 Eduardo Kingman (1913–1998)
 Efraín Andrade Viteri (1920–1997)
 Enrique Gomezjurado (1891–1978)
 Enrique Tábara (1930–2021)
 Estuardo Maldonado (born 1930)
 Félix Arauz (born 1935)
 Gonzalo Amancha (born 1948)
 Gonzalo Endara Crow (1936–1996)
 Hugo Cifuentes (photographer)
 Jorge Velarde (born 1960)
 José Carreño (born 1947)
 Juan Villafuerte (1945–1977)
 Judith Gutiérrez (1927–2003)
 Luis Miranda (1932–2016)
 Luis Molinari-Flores (1929–1994)
 Manuel Rendón (1894–1992)
 Marcos Restrepo (born 1961)
 Miguel Betancourt (born 1958)
 Oswaldo Guayasamín (1919–1999)
 Oswaldo Moncayo (1923–1984)
 Oswaldo Viteri (born 1931)
 Ramón Piaguaje (born 1962)
 Theo Constanté (1934–2014)
 Xavier Blum Pinto (born 1957)

El Salvador

 Noe Canjura (1922–1970)
 Beatriz Cortez
 Giovanni Gil (born 1971) Engraver (printmaker), Painter and Watercolorist
 Salarrué (Salvador Salazar Arrué)
 Nicolas F. Shi painter

Guatemala

 Rodolfo Abularach (1933–2020), painter, printmaker
 Ricardo Almendáriz (fl. 1787), draftsman
 José Luis Álvarez (1919–2012), painter
 Margarita Azurdia (1931–1998), sculptor, painter
 Andrés Curruchich (1891–1969), painter
 Darío Escobar (born 1971), sculptor
 Regina José Galindo
 Jessica Kairé (born 1980), sculptor, installation artist 
 Alfred Julio Jensen (1903–1981), abstract painter
 Jorge de León (born 1976), performance artist
 Aníbal López (born 1964), painter, performance artist, photography, videographer
 Carlos Mérida (1891–1984)
 Rafael Rodríguez Padilla (1890–1929), painter, printmaker, sculptor
 Carlos Mauricio Valenti Perrillat (1888–1912), painter
 Rafael Yela Günther (1888–1942), painter, sculptor
 Efraín Recinos (1928–2011), painter, sculptor, architect

Mexico

 Raúl Anguiano
 Ignacio Barrios, watercolorist 
 Luis Barragán, architect
 Arnold Belkin
 Maris Bustamante (born 1949)
 Miguel Cabrera (1695–1768), painter
 Leonora Carrington (1917–2011)
 Miguel Condé (born 1939)
 Roberto Cortázar (born 1962)
 Rodolfo Escalera (1929–2000)
 Julio Galán (1958–2006)
 Gunther Gerzso (1915–2000)
 Guillermo Gómez-Peña (born 1955)
 Graciela Iturbide, photographer
 Frida Kahlo (1907–1954)
 Guillermo Kahlo, photographer
 Myra Landau (1926–2018)
 Rafael Lozano-Hemmer
 Teresa Margolles (born 1963)
 Tina Modotti, photographer (1896–1942)
 Pablo O'Higgins
 José Clemente Orozco (1883–1949)
 Gabriel Orozco (born 1962)
 José Guadalupe Posada
 Diego Rivera (1886–1957)
 Verónica Ruiz de Velasco (born 1968)
 David Alfaro Siqueiros (1896–1974)
 Rufino Tamayo (1899–1991)
 Francisco Toledo (1940–2019)
 José María Velasco Gómez (1840–1912)

Nicaragua

Pablo Antonio Cuadra, graphic artist
Omar D'León, painter
Franck de Las Mercedes, artist
Armando Morales, painter
Hugo Palma-Ibarra, painter
Gabriel Traversari, painter
Julio Valle Castillo, painter
Ernesto Cardenal, poet

Panama

 Carlos Francisco Chang Marín, writer (1922–2012)
 Chafil Cheucarama, Wounaan painter, carver, and illustrator
 Guillermo Trujillo, painter (1927–2018)
 José Luis Rodríguez Pittí, writer, photographer (1971)
 Marco Ernesto (1923–1985)
 Antonio Jose Guzman
 Alfredo Sinclair, painter (1914–2014)
 Olga Sinclair, painter
 Rosa María Britton, artist, writer

Peru

 Pablo Amaringo
 Teresa Burga
 Martín Chambi, photographer
 Alberto Dávila
 Victor Delfín
 Fernando De Szyszlo
 Gloria Gómez-Sánchez
 Johanna Hamann
 Daniel Hernández (painter)
 Hugo Orellana Bonilla
 Carlos Enrique Polanco
 Diego Quispe Tito
 Susana Raab
 José Sabogal
 Josué Sánchez
 Basilio Santa Cruz Pumacallao (1635–1710), painter
 Victoria Santa Cruz
 Fernando de Szyszlo
 Elena Tejada-Herrera
 Mario Testino, photographer
 Tilsa Tsuchiya
 Mario Urteaga Alvarado
 Boris Vallejo
 Alberto Vargas
 Jorge Vinatea Reinoso
 Marcos Zapata or Marcos Sapaca Inca (c. 1710–1773) painter

Puerto Rico

 Olga Albizu (1924–2005)
 Allora & Calzadilla contemporary art duo
 Alfonso Arana (1927–2005)
 Ramón Atiles y Pérez (1804–1875)
 Myrna Báez (1931–2018)
 José Campeche (1751–1809)
 Daniel Lind-Ramos (born 1953)
 Pablo Marcano García (born 1952)
 Poli Marichal (born 1956)
 Soraida Martinez (born 1956)
 María de Mater O'Neill (born 1960)
 Frieda Medín (born 1949)
 Francisco Oller (1833–1917)
 Sandra Perez-Ramos
 Arnaldo Roche Rabell (1955–2018)
 Juan Sanchez (born 1954)
 Joe Shannon (artist) (born 1933)
 Alessandra Torres (born 1980)

Uruguay

 Zoma Baitler (1908–1994)
 Rafael Barradas (1890–1929)
 Eduardo Barreto
 Juan Manuel Blanes (1830–1901)
 Carlos Capelán (born 1948)
 José Cuneo Perinetti (1887–1977)
 Eladio Dieste (1917–2000)
 Pedro Figari (1861–1938)
 Haroldo González (born 1941)
 José Gurvich (1927–1974)
 Carlos María Herrera (1875–1914)
 Carlos Páez Vilaró (1923–2014)
 Virginia Patrone (born 1950)
 Daniel Pontet (born 1957)
 Nelbia Romero (1938-2015)
 Martín Sastre (born 1976)
 Joaquín Torres García (1874–1949)
 Teresa Trujillo (born 1937)
 Petrona Viera (1895–1960)
 José Luis Zorrilla de San Martín (1891–1975)

Venezuela

19th century Venezuelan artists (chronological order)
Carmelo Fernández (1809–1897), artist and painter
Martín Tovar y Tovar (1827–1902), artist and painter
Eloy Palacios (1847–1919), artist, sculptor and painter
Emilio Boggio  (1857–1920) painter
Cristóbal Rojas (1857–1890)
Arturo Michelena (1863–1898), painter

20th century Venezuelan artists (chronological order)
Federico Brandt (1878–1932), painter
Armando Reverón (1889–1954), painter
Manuel Cabré (1890–1984), painter
Juan Félix Sánchez (1900–1997), folk artist in weaving and sculpture
Francisco Narváez (1905–1982), sculptor
Gertrude Goldschmidt (1912–1994), a.k.a. "Gego"
César Rengifo (1915–1980)
Gabriel Bracho (1915–1995)
Braulio Salazar (1917–2008)
Mario Abreu (1919–1993)
Alejandro Otero (1921–1990)
Jesús Soto (1923–2005)
Oswaldo Vigas (1923–2014)
Carlos Cruz-Díez (1923–2019)
Elsa Gramcko (1925–1994)
Pedro León Zapata (1928–2015), artist, humorist and cartoonist
Mariano Díaz (photographer) (born 1929), journalist, photographer, designer, writer
Lía Bermúdez (1930–2021)
Marisol Escobar (1930–2016), sculptor
Jacobo Borges (born 1931), neo-figurative artist
Juan Calzadilla (born 1931), poet, painter and art critic
Julio Maragall (born 1936), sculptor
Harry Abend (1937–2021)
Balthazar Armas (1941–2015), contemporary and abstract movement painter
Paul del Rio (1943–2015), sculptor and painter
Jorge Blanco (born 1945), artist, sculptor, graphic designer, illustrator and humorist
Patricia van Dalen (born 1955)
Arturo Herrera (born 1959)

Contemporary Venezuelan artists (chronological order)
María Rivas (1960–2019), Latin jazz singer, composer, and occasional painter
Julio Aguilera (born 1961), painter and sculptor
Carla Arocha (born 1961)
José Antonio Hernández-Díez (born 1964)
Jaime Gili (born 1972)
Hermann Mejia (born 1973), illustrator, painter and sculptor
Yucef Merhi (born 1977)

See also
 Latin American art
 List of indigenous artists of the Americas
 List of Latin American writers

References

 
Latin
Artists